Marathi may refer to:
Marathi people, an Indo-Aryan ethnolinguistic group of Maharashtra, India
Marathi language, the Indo-Aryan language spoken by the Marathi people
Palaiosouda, also known as Marathi, a small island in Greece

See also 
 
Balbodh, the script used to write the Marathi language
Maharashtrian cuisine
 Maratha (disambiguation)

Language and nationality disambiguation pages